Girls Got Game is a 2021 Russian sports comedy film directed by Maksim Sveshnikov.
It was theatrically released in Russia on September 1, 2021, by Nashe Kino (English: Our Cinema).

Plot 
Dasha "Danya" Belykh was told from childhood that football is not a woman's business, but she still became the captain of the football team. Here are just her team unexpectedly gathered to close. Only victory can save them. And Danya decides to gather her childhood friends, with whom she played football at school. It turns out to be not so easy, and then there is a coach - a former "star" with problems, who does not consider women's football to be football at all ... But having sent self-doubt, excess weight and problems on the personal front to the bench, the girls are eager to win not only in sports, but also in life.

Cast 
 Lyubov Aksyonova as Dasha "Danya" Belykh, captain of the football team
 Egor Koreshkov as Vadim Panov, coach
 Yuliya Topolnitskaya as Alina
 Alina Alekseeva as Nadya
 Aleksandra Kuzenkina as Lena Terekhina
 Polina Aug as Yulya Malysheva
 Mariya Ivakova as Kristina
 Valentina Lyapina as "Sverchok"
 Zarina Mukhitdinova as Aliya
 Roman Madyanov as Palych
 Dmitry Miller as Kudryavtsev
 Mikhail Kremer as Artyom

Production
Filming took place in the city of Taganrog, Rostov Oblast, and the local metallurgical plant "TAGMET" became one of the key locations.

References

External links 
 Official website at the Russian World Vision 
 

2021 films
2020s Russian-language films
2020s sports comedy films
Russian sports comedy films
Films about women's sports
Russian association football films